The Arizona Department (1865−1867) was a department of the Second Mexican Empire, located in the present day state of Sonora in Northwestern Mexico.

It was established by an imperial decree on March 3, 1865, which specified:

It was directly south of the U.S. Arizona Territory, the present day state of Arizona. It was one among the 50 departments of the Second Mexican Empire and was administered by the prefect José Moreno Bustamante. The population of the department in the year 1865 was 25,603.

References

Mexican Empire
Departments
History of Sonora
Subdivisions of Mexico
1863 establishments in Mexico
1865 disestablishments in Mexico